In mathematics, a distribution function is a real function in measure theory. From every measure on the algebra of Borel sets of real numbers, a distribution function can be constructed, which reflects some of the properties of this measure. Distribution functions (in the sense of measure theory) are a generalization of distribution functions (in the sense of probability theory).

Definition 
Let  be a measure on the real numbers, equipped with the Borel -algebra. Then the function

defined by

is called the (right continuous) distribution function of the measure .

Example 
As the measure, choose the Lebesgue measure . Then by Definition of 

Therefore, the distribution function of the Lebesgue measure is

for all

Comments 
The definition of the distribution function (in the sense of measure theory) differs slightly from the definition of the distribution function (in the sense of probability theory). The latter has the boundary conditions

This makes this distribution function well defined for all probability measures.
However, in the case of an unbounded measure , defining the distribution function as in probability theory by

can be without meaning. This is since many measures take on the value  on all intervals , making their distribution function a constant function with value infinity. This is for example the case for the Lebesgue measure. To avoid this pathological case, the distribution function is defined to be zero at the origin. This makes sure that even for unbounded measures, the distribution function is well defined and finite close to the origin.

References  

Measure theory